The Mike Wallace Interview is a series of 30-minute television interviews conducted by host Mike Wallace from 1957 to 1960. From 1957 to 1959, they were carried by the ABC American Broadcasting Company television network, and in 1959–1960, they were offered by the NTA Film Network.

Before The Mike Wallace Interview was televised nationally on prime-time in 1957, Wallace had risen to prominence a year earlier with Night-Beat, a television interview program that aired in New York City.

The Ransom Center Collection 
In the early 1960s, Wallace donated kinescopes of these programs and related materials, including his prepared questions, research material, and correspondence, to the Ransom Center at The University of Texas at Austin.

On November 4, 2007, the School of Information at the University of Texas at Austin hosted online 65 of the interviews from 1957 to 1958. Sixty of the interviews in the Ransom Center's collection are kinescopes, 16mm recordings of the television programs made by filming the picture from a video monitor, with the remaining five on audio tape.

The 16mm films were transferred to video and, along with the audio tapes, subsequently digitized. The interviews were then transcribed and were embedded in the video files in the form of subtitles. Also included on the website are text files of the transcripts of each program.

The interviews hosted by The Ransom Center Collection include:

 Gloria Swanson, American film actress
 Rod Serling, American screenwriter, well known for his television series The Twilight Zone
 Mortimer Adler, American philosopher and author
 Steve Allen, comedian, musician, and television personality
 Harry Ashmore, editor of the Arkansas Gazette in Little Rock and Pulitzer Prize winner
 Diana Barrymore, actress and daughter of actor John Barrymore
 Pearl Buck, Pulitzer- and Nobel Prize-winning novelist
 Bennett Cerf, publisher and co-founder of Random House
 Salvador Dalí, Spanish surrealist painter
 Kirk Douglas, American actor
 William O. Douglas, US Supreme Court Justice
 Erich Fromm, psychoanalyst and social critic
 Oscar Hammerstein, Broadway lyricist
 Samuel David Hawkins, defector in the Korean War
 Robert Hutchins, educational philosopher, former dean of Yale Law School, former president and chancellor of The University of Chicago
 Aldous Huxley, author and social critic
 Henry Kissinger, expert on nuclear arms (later to become US Secretary of State under Richard M. Nixon)
 Reinhold Niebuhr, theologian
 Ayn Rand, American novelist
 Eleanor Roosevelt, wife of Franklin D. Roosevelt
 Leonard Ross, 12-year-old child prodigy, one of the most successful money-winners in quiz show history
 Margaret Sanger, leader of the birth control movement in America
 Jean Seberg, American actor
 Adlai Stevenson, former US presidential candidate
 Peter Ustinov, actor, playwright, director, and novelist
 Frank Lloyd Wright, American architect
 Dagmar (American actress), real name Virginia Ruth Egnor, actor, model, and television personality.

See also
 Profiles in Courage, section: Authorship controversy

References

External links 
The Mike Wallace Interview, list of interview videos, at The University of Texas School of Information (alternalte video link)
The Mike Wallace Interview at The Harry Ransom Center
The Mike Wallace Interview at Television Obscurities

1957 American television series debuts
1960 American television series endings
American television talk shows
Black-and-white American television shows